Maciej Zieliński (born 5 January 1971) is a Polish former professional basketball player. He is known as one of the all-time greats in Polish basketball. He studied in the United States at Providence College. With the national team he participated at EuroBasket 1991 and EuroBasket 1997, as the Polish national team finished seventh in both tournaments. He played vast majority of his professional career with Śląsk Wrocław, where he became a multiple Polish champion and the Polish Basketball League Most Valuable Player.

Honours
Club career
 8× Polish Basketball League champion (1991, 1992, 1996, 1998, 1999, 2000, 2001, 2002)
 5× Polish Cup (1989, 1990, 1992, 1997, 2004, 2005)

Individual awards
 3× PLK Most Valuable Player (1992, 1997, 1999)
 Polish League Finals MVP (1999)

External links
 College stats at Sports-Reference.com
 International stats at Basketball-Reference.com
 Polish league stats 
 National team profile at FIBA.com

1971 births
Living people
Polish men's basketball players
Providence Friars men's basketball players
Shooting guards
Śląsk Wrocław basketball players
Small forwards
Sportspeople from Wrocław